Abderahim Mechenouai  (b. ) is an Algerian boxer best known for winning the All-Africa title 2007 as a flyweight boxer.

Career
At the All-Africa Games he won the final against South African Jackson Chauke.

He failed to qualify for the Olympics as he lost his match to Abdelillah Nhaila.

External links
All Africa
Qualifier

Living people
Flyweight boxers
Year of birth missing (living people)
Algerian male boxers
African Games gold medalists for Algeria
African Games medalists in boxing
Competitors at the 2007 All-Africa Games
21st-century Algerian people